Fiji Sun is a daily newspaper published in Fiji since September 1999 and owned by Sun News Limited. Fiji Sun was founded by and is part of CJ. Patel Group.

The Fiji Sun has its main newsroom in Suva, Fiji. Its print center remains in suburban Walu Bay, from where the paper was founded in September 1999.

The Fiji Sun also has an online edition which is updated daily. An e-paper edition is also published.

Politics

Fijian politics
The Fiji Sun tends to be supportive of Frank Bainimarama's FijiFirst party, which has been confirmed by a journalist for the Fiji Sun in 2014. This has lead to many accusations of media bias.

During the lead-ups to the 2014 and 2018 general elections, the Fiji Sun was the main provider of opinion polls for these elections, which were conducted for the newspaper by Razor Research in 2014 and Western Force Research in 2018. In the lead-up to the 2022 election, the Fiji Sun released very few opinion polls compared to in 2014 and 2018 due to restrictions adopted by the government. In 2022, one poll conducted for the Fiji Sun by Western Force Research was found to have breached the set guidelines.

Foreign politics
Due to Australia's sanctions against Fiji enforced by the Labor governments of Kevin Rudd and Julia Gillard following the 2006 coup d'état, the Fiji Sun, was critical of the federal Labor government and was somewhat supportive of Tony Abbott and the Coalition. The Fiji Sun endorsed Abbott at the 2010 and 2013 federal elections. This was primarily due to Abbott's commitment to normalising relations between the two countries, which prompted Prime Minister Frank Bainimarama to personally endorse Abbott on both occasions. After Abbott's landslide victory in 2013 and the return of democratic elections in Fiji in 2014, relations were normalised.

For a similar reason to the Australia, the Fiji Sun was also critical of the New Zealand National Party government, led by John Key. However, the Fiji Sun's position changed when Key's government normalised relations between the two countries in 2014.

During the lead-up to the 2016 United States presidential election, the Fiji Sun was somewhat supportive of Barack Obama and Hillary Clinton and somewhat critical of Donald Trump. The Fiji Sun endorsed Clinton for the election.

See also

Culture of Fiji

References

Fijian culture
Newspapers published in Fiji
Publications established in 1999